Timothy Joseph Clarke (born 19 September 1968 in Stourbridge, England) is an English former footballer and now goalkeeper coach.

Career

He is perhaps best known for his spell as number 1 at Huddersfield Town where his tendency to make mistakes led to his nickname 'Coco'. Town fans at Leeds Road savoured the heart-in-mouth adrenalin rush whenever opponents centred the ball from the wing; the nickname was chanted (and acknowledged) with great affection and humour.

One of Clarke's more notable achievements came in 2001, when he was a part of the Barry Town side that won in Azerbaijan against Shamkir FC. The match marked the first ever occasion that Welsh club would progress in the UEFA Champions League. Clarke also played in goal against FC Porto in the next round, helping Barry to a second leg victory that has become footballing folklore in South Wales.

Clarke went into coaching at Halesowen Town before joining Hinckley AFC in May 2014 as a goalkeeper coach.

References

External links

1968 births
Living people
Sportspeople from Stourbridge
English footballers
Association football goalkeepers
Coventry City F.C. players
Huddersfield Town A.F.C. players
Rochdale A.F.C. players
Altrincham F.C. players
Shrewsbury Town F.C. players
York City F.C. players
Scunthorpe United F.C. players
Kidderminster Harriers F.C. players
Halesowen Town F.C. players
Willenhall Town F.C. players
Evesham United F.C. players
Barry Town United F.C. players
Bromsgrove Rovers F.C. players